Simone Rignault (5 May 1943 – 15 January 2019) was a French politician.

Early life 
After a first year in literature, she obtained a degree in psychology and became a school psychologist.
Elected mayor of Saint-Honoré-les-Bains in 1989, she also ran in 1993 in the elections of the Xth legislature of the Fifth Republic, where she was elected to the National Assembly. She leaves her profession to devote herself full-time to politics. Jacques Chirac appoints her to the Economic and Social Council from 1997 to 1999, where she is a member of the section and president of the Cultural Commission.
Passionate about history and collector of old books, paintings and earthenware, with a predilection for those who come from the Pottery of the Mountain, she has offered many pieces to the local museum, installed in the town hall, under his mandate. She defended with her municipal team the local heritage, implementing the actions necessary for its valorization.
Married, she is the mother of four boys and has grandchildren; she is widowed since 1985. She dies on January 15, 2019.

References

1943 births
2019 deaths
Deputies of the 10th National Assembly of the French Fifth Republic
Union for a Popular Movement politicians
Rally for the Republic politicians
Women mayors of places in France
Women members of the National Assembly (France)
People from Nièvre
20th-century French women
21st-century French women